Yekaterina ("Katya") Shatnaya (born February 21, 1979 in Almaty) is an athlete from Kazakhstan, who competes in triathlon. Shatnaya competed at the second Olympic triathlon at the 2004 Summer Olympics.  She took forty-first place with a total time of 2:19:26.75.

References
 Profile

1979 births
Living people
Triathletes at the 2004 Summer Olympics
Kazakhstani female triathletes
Olympic triathletes of Kazakhstan
Sportspeople from Almaty
Triathletes at the 2010 Asian Games
Triathletes at the 2006 Asian Games
Asian Games competitors for Kazakhstan